Fred Keating may refer to:

Frederick Keating (1859–1928), Catholic bishop
Fred Keating (magician) (1901-1961), American magician and film actor
Fred Keating (actor) (b. 1949), Canadian-American television and film actor